Raymond Sampson (born 1965) is an Irish former hurler who played at club level with Garryspillane and at inter-county level with the Limerick senior hurling team. He usually lined out as a forward.

Career

Sampson first came to prominence as a hurler at juvenile and underage levels with the Garryspillane club before eventually progressing onto the club's top adult team. During his club career he claimed championship medals in the junior and intermediate grades, while he also won two senior titles with the Limerick Club in New York. Sampson also represented the St. Flannan's College team  in his youth and won consecutive All-Ireland Colleges Championship titles in 1982 and 1983, having earlier won consecutive Harty Cup titles. He first appeared on the inter-county scene as a member of the Limerick minor hurling team in 1983, before winning a Munster Under-21 Championship title in 1986. Sampson was a regular with the Limerick senior team for almost a decade, during which time he won two National Hurling League titles.

Honours

St. Flannan's College
Dr. Croke Cup: 1982, 1983
Dr. Harty Cup: 1982, 1983

Garryspillane
Limerick Intermediate Hurling Championship: 1990, 1996
Limerick Junior Hurling Championship: 1984

Limerick Club, New York
New York Senior Hurling Championship: 1994, 1995

Limerick
National Hurling League: 1984-85, 1991-92
Munster Under-21 Hurling Championship: 1986

References

1965 births
Living people
Garryspillane hurlers
Limerick inter-county hurlers